A paperless loan is a financial transaction in which one party (i.e. the lender) agrees to give another party (i.e. the borrower) a certain amount of money with the expectation of repayment together with the fee agreed upon by both parties solely online or over the phone. The predominant difference of a traditional loan compared to the paperless loan lies within its paperless application process and the absence of interest. Instead of charging borrowers an interest rate, lenders will charge a fee that may range from $10 to $30 for each borrowed $100. Plenty of paper agreements can be avoided as lenders do not require a written proof of employment or income since such information can be confirmed with the aid of online databases.

Paperless loans are usually from a minimum of $100 to a maximum of $1,500 with an average amount varying between $200 and $500. The exact eligible amount is determined when applying and depends on an income reported by the customer.

Criticism
Some people argue that paperless payday lenders target fragile people, such as low-income communities, emphasizing the ease of getting a loan regardless of the target audience being fragile and unfamiliar with the repaying process.

References

Loans
Personal finance
Credit